The members of the 15th General Assembly of Newfoundland were elected in the Newfoundland general election held in October 1885. The general assembly sat from 1886 to 1889.

The Reform Party led by Robert Thorburn formed the government.

A.J.W. McNeilly was chosen as speaker.

Sir William Des Vœux served as colonial governor of Newfoundland until 1887. Sir Henry Arthur Blake succeeded Des Vœux as governor.

In 1887, the Ballot Act was passed which allowed voting by secret ballot as opposed to the previous system of public oral voting. In 1888, a new Elections Act was passed which defined the required qualifications for candidates for the House of Assembly. In 1889, a new Representation Act was passed which redefined the boundaries of electoral districts.

Members of the Assembly 
The following members were elected to the assembly in 1885:

Notes:

By-elections 
By-elections were held to replace members for various reasons:

Notes:

References 

Terms of the General Assembly of Newfoundland and Labrador